The Webb–Pomerene Act was a law passed in 1918 that exempted certain exporters' associations from certain antitrust regulations.
Sponsored by Rep. Edwin Y. Webb (D) of North Carolina and Sen. Atlee Pomerene (D) of Ohio, the act granted immunity from antitrust regulation to companies that combined to operate the export trade that was essential to the war effort.  The act was important because it granted exemptions from the Clayton Antitrust Act of 1914.  Many large conglomerates that had previously been subject to Federal antitrust investigations were now free to continue "business as usual" because they "aided" the war effort.  Webb-Pomerene exemptions lasted well into the 1920s as the Federal Trade Commission granted stays of investigation for those companies that initially qualified for exemption under the 1918 act.

References

Further reading

United States federal antitrust legislation